Apantesis hewletti is a moth of the family Erebidae. It was described by William Barnes and James Halliday McDunnough in 1918. It is found in the United States in southwestern California.

The length of the forewings is about 20 mm. The ground color of the forewings is black with pale, yellowish or pinkish-buff bands. The hindwings are bright yellow, but may vary to orange or scarlet. The markings are black. Adults have been recorded on wing in May.

This species was formerly a member of the genus Grammia, but was moved to Apantesis along with the other species of the genera Holarctia, Grammia, and Notarctia.

References

 

Arctiina
Moths described in 1918